IRJ, a three letter acronym, may refer to:

International Railway Journal
Indian Regional Jet
Insulated rail joint, an electrically insulated railjoint (see Fishplate)
IATA code for Capitán Vicente Almandos Almonacid Airport in La Rioja, Argentina